Filip Gachevski (born 17 August 1990) is a Macedonian footballer who plays as a goalkeeper for Macedonian Second League club Vardar.

International career
In November 2016 he received his first call-up to the senior Macedonia squad for a match against Spain.

References

External links

1990 births
Living people
People from Murska Sobota
Slovenian people of Macedonian descent
Association football goalkeepers
Slovenian footballers
Macedonian footballers
North Macedonia youth international footballers
ND Mura 05 players
Kapfenberger SV players
FC Lustenau players
FK Bregalnica Štip players
FK Vardar players
Slovenian PrvaLiga players
Austrian Football Bundesliga players
Austrian Regionalliga players
Macedonian First Football League players
Macedonian expatriate footballers
Expatriate footballers in Slovenia
Macedonian expatriate sportspeople in Slovenia
Expatriate footballers in Austria
Macedonian expatriate sportspeople in Austria